The All-African Trade Union Federation (AATUF) was a Pan-African trade union organisation, formed in November 1959 on the initiative of president Kwame Nkrumah of Ghana. The secretary of AATUF was Amadou N'diaye. The assistant secretary general was Ochola Ogaye Mak'Anyengo.

In 1973 AATUF was replaced by the Organisation of African Trade Union Unity (OATUU).

Bibliography
 Agyeman, Opoku, The Failure of Grassroots Pan-Africanism: The Case of the All-African Trade Union Federation, .

References

Organisation of African Trade Union Unity
Trade unions established in 1959
Trade unions disestablished in 1973